Chiloglanis emarginatus, the Phongolo suckermouth, is a species of upside-down catfish native to Eswatini, Mozambique, South Africa and Zimbabwe where it occurs in the Pongola, Komati, Pungwe and the middle to lower Zambezi Rivers.  This species grows to a length of  SL.  This fish is of minor importance in local fisheries.

References

External links 

emarginatus
Freshwater fish of Africa
Fish of Mozambique
Fish of South Africa
Fish of Eswatini
Fish of Zimbabwe
Fish described in 1969